The Miaowei Dam is a rock-filled embankment dam on the Lancang (Mekong) River in Yunlong County of Yunnan Province, China. Construction on the dam began in 2010. The four turbines of 1,400 MW hydroelectric power station were commissioned in 2017 and 2018.

See also

Hydropower in the Mekong River Basin
List of tallest dams in the world
List of dams and reservoirs in China
List of tallest dams in China

References

Dams in China
Dams in the Mekong River Basin
Hydroelectric power stations in Yunnan
Buildings and structures in Dali Bai Autonomous Prefecture
Rock-filled dams